Leung Ying (also known as Loy Yeung) was a Chinese mass murderer who, at the age of 29, killed 11 people on a farm near Fairfield, California on August 22, 1928, before escaping the scene. He was arrested by police the next day and sentenced to death on August 31. Ying committed suicide in his prison cell on October 22, about two weeks before his set execution date.

This was the worst case of mass murder in California history at that time, surpassing the killing of six persons each by James Dunham on a farm in Santa Clara County in 1896, and by John Goins in Stockton and Galt in 1926.

Life
Ying, who also went by the names Wong Gay and Lim Onn, had been arrested by San Francisco police in 1924 as a gunman and narcotics peddler.
He had a reputation as a killer, boasting he had killed three people in a tong war, and was generally regarded as a "bad" person.
For some time he lived in San Jose and worked there at a local packing plant. He was a member of the Hop Sing Tong, until he was expelled due to his excessive use of narcotics.

For three months he was employed as a cook or fruit picker at the Bryan ranch five miles from Fairfield, which was leased by Wong Gee. Ying was eventually dismissed for either assaulting or having an affair with Wong Gee's daughter Nellie.

Six months prior to Leung Ying's attack on the ranch, another Chinese worker had run amok there with an axe and set fire to two buildings, before he was shot by Wong Gee. The killing was later declared an act of self-defense by the superior court.

Murders
On August 22, 1928, Ying, armed with a rifle and a hatchet, and under the influence of cocaine, returned to the ranch and attacked the residents and workers there.

According to reports, Ying first entered what was variously identified as an underground gambling room, or a dugout, where Wong Gee attempted to wake two farm hands. He shot Wong Gee through the heart and also killed worker Cheung Yueng. Both were later found by police lying fully dressed on a bed. The other farm laborer, Wa Wey, was fatally wounded by a shot in the back, when he was trying to run away.

Next the killer went to the house of Wong Gee's brother, Wong Hueng, who had locked himself in and attempted to hide under a bed, though Ying shot through a window, hitting him in the abdomen.
Ying then made his way to the home of the cook on the ranch, 61-year-old Low Shek, who was wounded by a shot through the stomach. Low Shek was later taken to Fairfield hospital, where he died after a few hours.

While proceeding through a pear orchard towards the home of Wong Gee, Ying shot and killed worker Yeung Soon. At the door of the house he killed Wong Gee's wife with a shot between the eyes and decapitated the 2-week-old baby in her arms with the hatchet, before walking into the children's room. There he shot Wong Gee's 4-year-old son, Johnnie, through the head at close range before using his axe to crush the skull of 3-year-old Willie Wong, who was lying in his bed. Ying also fatally wounded 15-year-old Nellie Wong by shooting her in the back, after she had jumped out of a window and tried to escape through the orchard. She died in Vallejo hospital on August 27, becoming Leung Ying's eleventh and final victim. Two other of Wong Gee's children, Ruth and Helen, managed to escape unharmed by hiding under a bed.

After mutilating the body of Mrs. Wong with the hatchet, Leung Ying eventually escaped in an automobile owned by Wong Gee. In less than 20 minutes he had killed or fatally wounded eleven people. The next day, after abandoning his car and rifle, Ying was captured by police, while sleeping in a tank house near the Empire mine in Grass Valley. He was taken to Nevada City, where he was held until the arrival of the Fairfield authorities.

Victims

Aftermath
During his interrogation Ying readily admitted to having committed the murders, and stated that he had seen the police officers trailing him during the night, and, although he had the opportunity to shoot them at any time, he refrained from doing so, because he feared he would be hanged, if he killed a white man. Asked for the motive behind his rampage, Ying initially recited the story of his love for a Chinese girl and the disapproval of this relationship by her family. Furthermore, he stated that the Wong Gee family tried to kill him with poisoned food, so he killed them first, while he later told that incessant teasing had pushed him to commit the murders. He also expressed his admiration for Californian criminals Joe Tanko and Floyd Hall, saying: "I just like Tanko and Hall – very, very sick."

The night after his arrest Leung Ying attempted to commit suicide by hanging himself with a blanket. After this attempt was foiled by prison guards he spent the night beating his head against the floor and walls, crying for narcotics. The next day, on August 24, Leung was arraigned at the Superior Court in Suisun City, where again he admitted committing the murders, stating he wished he had the opportunity to kill half a dozen more.

Verdict
After pleading guilty, Ying was sentenced to death by hanging on August 31, 1928. His execution was to take place on November 9 of the same year.

On October 22, 1928, between 9 p.m. and 11 p.m., Leung Ying committed suicide in his prison cell in San Quentin Prison by hanging himself with a towel.

References

Bibliography
Lockie, Evelyn: The Village That Vanished in Solano Historian, December 1985.
Waters, Tony: When killing is a crime; Lynne Rienner Publishers Inc, 2007. 
Solano's Sheriff – Jack Thornton Makes Record in Capturing Murderous Chinese Gunman, in Douglas 20 Police Journal; October 1928 (p. 8).
; Leung, Peter C.Y. and Tony Waters  "Chinese Pioneer Farming Families in the Suisun Valley of California, " in 150 Year of Chinese Presence in California, published by the Sacramento Chinese Cultural Foundation and Asian-American Studies, University of California, Davis 2001.

External links
Chinese community falls apart after mass murder, Daily Republic (March 23, 2001)
Eleven Chinese, Time (September 3, 1928)
Runs amuck and kills 10, The New York Times (August 23, 1928)
Capture California Chinese Killer, The New York Times (August 24, 1928)
Chinaman runs amuck; 10 dead, The Atlanta Constitution (August 23, 1928)
Chinese slayer of ten caught in chicken house, The Atlanta Constitution (August 24, 1928)
Chinese massacres ten, Los Angeles Times (August 23, 1928)
Chinese Cook Slays Nine Persons, Wounds 6 Others With Rifle and Hatchet, The Hartford Courant (August 23, 1928)
Chinese, Who Killed 10, Sought 6 More Lives, The Washington Post (August 25, 1928)
Chinese cook goes on rampage and kills 9, Eugene Register-Guard (August 22, 1928)
Chinese killer of 10 is terror to countryside, Miami Daily News (August 23, 1928)
Slayer of ten, The Pittsburgh Press (August 28, 1928)
Nine Chinese slain by crazed Oriental, Berkeley Daily Gazette (August 22, 1928)
Crazed Chinaman slays 10 persons, The Ludington Daily News (August 23, 1928)
Chinese slayer is sought by posses, The Owosso Argus-Press (August 23, 1928)
Murderer of ten and victims, San Jose News (August 25, 1928)
Ten Chinese dead when worker runs amok with pistol, The Palm Beach Post (August 23, 1928)
Maniac who murdered ten persons caught by police, The Evening Independent (August 24, 1928)

1928 suicides
Chinese mass murderers
Chinese murderers of children
Chinese prisoners sentenced to death
People convicted of murder by California
Prisoners sentenced to death by California
Murderers who committed suicide in prison custody
Suicides by hanging in California
Chinese emigrants to the United States
Place of birth missing
American mass murderers
American murderers of children
Year of birth missing
Family murders
Chinese people who died in prison custody
Prisoners who died in California detention